Blanchard Valley Health System, or (BVHS), is a non-profit, integrated regional health system based in Findlay, a city in Ohio. Governed by a community board of trustees representing large and small business, education, law, medicine, and finance, BVHS oversees all operations of its member organizations. BVHS is one of the largest employers in its micropolitan area, employing more than 3000 people.

BVHS serves an eight-county area that includes Allen, Hancock, Hardin, Henry, Putnam, Seneca, Wood and Wyandot counties in Ohio.

In addition, a dedicated group of more than 600 volunteers support BVHS through their contributions.

History
BVHS has a long history of service to Findlay and the surrounding area.

Blanchard Valley Hospital, the anchor subsidiary of BVHS, was founded in 1891 as the Findlay Home for Friendless Women and Children. 

Bluffton Hospital was founded in 1908 by Dr. J. J. Suter.

The two hospitals merged in 1995 to create the Blanchard Valley Regional Health Center and later, the Blanchard Valley Health Association (BVHA). In 2007, BVHA changed its name to Blanchard Valley Health System.

Both Blanchard Valley Hospital and Bluffton Hospital are members of the Ohio Hospital Association.

In addition to Blanchard Valley Hospital and Bluffton Hospital, BVHS also operates the Jack Schaefer Retirement Community (which includes Birchaven Village, Birchaven Estates and Birchaven Heights), Bridge Home Health & Hospice, Northwest Ohio Medical Equipment, Blanchard Valley Regional Cancer Center, Physicians Plus Urgent Care, Blanchard Valley Sleep Disorders Center, Wound Care Solutions, Caughman Health Center, EasternWoods Outpatient Center and several other health-related businesses in northwest Ohio.

Health services
 Behavioral Health
 Cancer Care
 Cardiology
 Diabetes Care
 Dialysis
 Emergency/Trauma
 Home Health
 Hospice
 Imaging/Radiology
 Laboratory Services
 Minimally Invasive Surgery
 Orthopedics
 Pain Treatment
 Pediatrics
 Pharmacy
 Physician Referral Service
 Rehabilitation
 Robotic Surgery
 Senior Living
 Sleep Disorders
 Special Care Nursery
 Urgent Care
 Women's Health
 Wound Care

References

External links
Blanchard Valley Health System official Web site
Blanchard Valley Hospital
Bluffton Hospital
Jack Schaefer Retirement Community

Healthcare in Ohio
Hospital networks in the United States
Hancock County, Ohio
Findlay, Ohio
Medical and health organizations based in Ohio